Pelé is a 1977 album by the Brazilian composer and arranger Sérgio Mendes and the Brazilian footballer Pelé. It was the soundtrack for a documentary about Pelé's life. The album was Pelé's debut as a singer and songwriter. Pelé sings on "Meu Mundo É uma Bola (My World Is a Ball)" and "Cidade Grande (Big City)", accompanied largely by Gracinha Leporace.

Reception

Fred Beldin reviewed the reissue of the album for Allmusic and wrote that "...the sounds are as lilting and tropical as all of the Brazilian light jazz specialist's work, though there are a few moments of quiet brooding that are unexpected. While plenty of non-musical celebrities have embarrassed themselves with their attempts at pop stardom, Pelé's contributions are pleasant and low-key". Beldin wrote of Pelé and Gracinha Leporace's vocals that her "soft, sweet tones blend smoothly with the soccer star to ensure that he never strays into discordant territory".

Track listing 
 "O Coração do Rei (The King's Heart)" –  1:35
 "Meu Mundo É uma Bola (My World Is a Ball)" –  4:07
 "Memorias (Memories)" –  1:06
 "Nascimento (Birth)" –  0:31
 "Voltando a Bauru (Back to Bauru)" –  2:52
 "Cidade Grande (Big City)" –  0:50
 "Cidade Grande (Big City)" –  2:24
 "Alma Latina (Latin Soul)" –  3:21
 "A Tristeza do Adeus (The Sadness of Goodbye)" –  1:32
 "A Tristeza do Adeus (The Sadness of Goodbye)" –  4:44
 "Na Bahia (In Bahia)" –  2:43
 "Amore e Agressao (Love and Aggression)" –  3:26
 "Meu Mundo É uma Bola (My World Is a Ball)" –  3:52

Personnel 
Pelé – vocals on "Meu Mundo É uma Bola (My World Is a Ball)" and "Cidade Grande (Big City)"
Gracinha Leporace, Carol Rogers – vocals
Gerry Mulligan – baritone saxophone, alto saxophone
Bill Dickinson – double bass
Oscar Castro-Neves – guitar
Chico Spider – keyboards
Jim Keltner – drums
Chacal, Laudir De Oliveira, Steve Forman – percussion
Sérgio Mendes – arranger, producer
Geoff Gillette – engineer

References

1977 soundtrack albums
Albums arranged by Sérgio Mendes
Albums produced by Sérgio Mendes
Portuguese-language soundtracks
Sérgio Mendes albums
Atlantic Records soundtracks
Pelé
Things named after Pelé